Centule VI (also Centulle) (died 17 July 1134 at the Battle of Fraga) was the Viscount of Béarn from 1131 to his death. Like his father, he was an ideal Christian prince for his age, ready to serve the Church in the Reconquista.

He was the eldest son and successor of Gaston IV and Talesa. He was a minor when he succeeded his father and his mother assumed the regency. His tutor was Guy de Lons, Bishop of Lescar, who also commanded the army during the period of Centule's minority.

In 1134, Centule led the Bearnese to join the crusade of Alfonso the Battler against the Almoravid fortress of Fraga at the Battle of Fraga. He himself led the troops in battle, but died when the united Christian army was routed by the Almoravids.

As Centule had no children, Béarn passed to his elder sister Guiscarda and her son Peter II.

1134 deaths
Viscounts of Béarn
People of the Reconquista
Year of birth missing